Kaligi (Arabic: Feroghe) is an ethnic group in South Sudan. Most of its members are Muslims. The number of persons in this group is above 10,000. They live in Bahr el Ghazal.

See also
Kaligi language

References

Kaligi Joshua Project

Ethnic groups in South Sudan